Haide-Ene Rebassoo (born 25 January 1935 in Tallinn) is an Estonian botanist.

She was affiliated with the Institute of Zoology and Botany from 1960 to 1979 and 1983–1993. In 1975 she notably published her scientific findings on sea shore plants in the Islands of Estonia.

Notable publications
1967: "Hiiumaa floora ja selle genees"
1972: "Laidude raamat"
1973: "Hiiumaa"
1974: "Eesti taimeriigis"
1975: "Botaanilisi kilde 17 Hiiumaa suvest"
1975: "Sea-shore plant communities of the Estonian islands"
1979: "Eesti taimharuldusi"
1981: "Kaitskem kauneid taimi

References

External links
Publications at the Open Library

1935 births
Living people
20th-century Estonian botanists
Scientists from Tallinn
University of Tartu alumni
20th-century Estonian women scientists